Habit Awlad Muhammad Airport is an airport in the Jabal al Gharbi District of Libya, located approximately  south-southwest of Tripoli in the Libyan desert. Its primary use is the transportation of oilfield workers from production facilities in the area.

World War II
During World War II the airfield, then known as Tmed El Chel Airfield was used as a military airfield by the  United States Army Air Force during the North African Campaign against Axis forces.

USAAF Ninth Air Force units which used the airfield were:

 81st Bombardment Squadron, (12th Bombardment Group), 11 January-3 February 1943, B-25 Mitchell
 82d Bombardment Squadron,  (12th Bombardment Group), 10 January-4 February 1943, B-25 Mitchell

See also
Transport in Libya
List of airports in Libya

References

External links
OpenStreetMap - Habit Awlad Muhammad Airport
OurAirports - Habit Awlad Muhammad Airport

Airfields of the United States Army Air Forces in Libya
World War II airfields in Libya